Vanessa Alexandra Mendoza Bustos (born 25 July 1981), better known simply as Vanessa Mendoza, is a Colombian politician, actress and fashion model who held the Miss Colombia title in 2001, being the first Afro-Colombian to win that contest.

Biography
Mendoza is a native of the Chocó Department, Colombia. She grew up in a small town named Unguía. Mendoza grew up in poverty, and she was one of sixteen children.  Her father died when she was still young, leaving her mother to care for the family. Despite the poor conditions the family endured, Vanessa showed early interest in becoming a model, and began pursuing that career.

Mendoza became Miss Chocó in 2001, a year in which Miss Colombia was facing a racial scandal. She became the first Black Miss Colombia, winning the title over first runner up, Consuelo Guzmán Parra. Despite suspicion that she had won the contest so that rumors about racism in it would be eradicated, Mendoza became popular among Colombians, who gave her the nickname "Black Barbie". Mendoza was the object of an official reception in Cartagena after her victory, where she declared that she was about representing her race and country.  

Mendoza replaced Andrea Nocetti as Miss Colombia. Prior to winning Miss Colombia, Mendoza had the distinction of being the only contestant of the pageant's 2001 version not to admit having a plastic surgery for the contest.  Mendoza participated in the Miss Universe 2002 pageant, winning the Best National Costume award.

On March 2, 2005, she and United States comedian Chris Tucker were the key speakers at a speech in Benedict College.

Politics
She won a seat as part of the black minority in Congress and became a member of Chamber of Representatives from 2017 to 2018. Colombia's 10% black minority has the right to two of the 166 seats in the lower congressional chamber.

References

External links
 Benedict.edu
 Vanessa Mendoza and the Miss Colombia 2001 fairytale

1981 births
Colombian female models
Living people
Miss Colombia winners
Miss Universe 2002 contestants
Afro-Colombian women
Beauty queen-politicians
People from Quibdó